The 10th World Festival of Youth and Students (WFYS) was held from 28 July to 5 August 1973 in Berlin, capital city of the then German Democratic Republic.

The city hosted the festival for the second time, which was participated by 30,000 young people representing 140 countries under the motto "For Anti-Imperialist Solidarity, Peace and Friendship".

References

World Festival of Youth and Students
International sports competitions hosted by East Germany
1973 in East Germany
1973 conferences
1973 in multi-sport events
Multi-sport events in East Germany
Festivals in East Germany
East Berlin
Events in Berlin
1970s in Berlin
Sports festivals in Germany
1973 festivals
1973 in East German sport